Brigadier General Diego Lamas is the name given to a train station in a rural area of the Artigas Department of northern Uruguay, by decree Ley No. 11.857. During the census of 2004, no population was recorded in this location. In the satellite image of 8/10/2003 (currently the latest of the area), about 30 small buildings appear near the station (see ).

References

External links
INE map of Arigas Department (pdf 1.9 MB)

Railway stations in Uruguay
Buildings and structures in Artigas Department